The 2016 Shanghai Darts Masters was the inaugural staging of the tournament by the Professional Darts Corporation, as a third entry in the 2016 World Series of Darts. The tournament featured eight Asian players who facing eight PDC players and was held at the Pullman Hotel Shanghai South in Shanghai, China from 25–26 June 2016.

Michael van Gerwen won the title, defeating James Wade 8–3 in the final.

Qualifiers

The four seeded PDC players were:
  Gary Anderson (quarter-finals)
  Michael van Gerwen (winner)
  Adrian Lewis (quarter-finals)
  Phil Taylor (semi-finals)

The next four seeded PDC players were (drawn at random into seeded side of the draw):
  James Wade (runner-up)
  Dave Chisnall (semi-finals)
  Raymond van Barneveld (quarter-finals)
  Peter Wright (quarter-finals)

The following players were invited:
  Paul Lim (first round)
  Scott MacKenzie (first round)
  Royden Lam (first round)
  Yunfei Jiang (first round)

The Chinese qualifiers were:
  Yuanjun Liu (first round)
  Shiyan Lai (first round)
  Lihao Wen (first round)
  Jianhua Shen (first round)

Draw

References

Shanghai Darts Masters
World Series of Darts